Rudolph the Red-Nosed Reindeer and the Island of Misfit Toys is a 2001 computer-animated Christmas film adventure musical film directed by Bill Kowalchuk for GoodTimes Entertainment. It was released on VHS and DVD on October 30, 2001. The film takes place after the events of the original special (despite Rudolph and Clarice utilizing their young designs from that special). The film thus revisits classic characters like Yukon Cornelius, Hermey the elf (now a dentist), Abominable Snow Monster, and Rudolph the Red-Nosed Reindeer, who is now famous in the North Pole.

GoodTimes Entertainment, three years prior, had released Rudolph the Red-Nosed Reindeer: The Movie, which was set in a separate continuity with different supporting characters. Several key personnel were retained from that movie: Kathleen Barr, the voice of Rudolph; Michael Aschner, the head writer; and Bill Kowalchuk, the director. Golden Books Family Entertainment was likewise retained as the production company.

The voice cast includes Rick Moranis, Jamie Lee Curtis, and Richard Dreyfuss among others.

Plot
Rudolph, not satisfied with being a "novelty act" performing tricks with his nose, travels with Hermey to the Island of Misfit Toys to give King Moonracer a root canal dental treatment. A storm sends Rudolph and Hermey to Castaway Cove where Rudolph considers having his nose made more normal-looking by a hippopotamus named Queen Camilla.

Meanwhile, the evil Toy Taker is stealing all of the toys from the island, including Santa's workshop (which made Santa cry), claiming that he's saving them from the inevitable fact that children eventually outgrow their toys and throw them away. Rudolph has a plan to foil the Toy Taker's by disguising themselves as toys.

The Toy Taker's blimp arrives and manages to steal them along with the Misfit Toys, all except for Bumble, who is too big to fit into the blimp so he follows on a floating iceberg. Rudolph tries to talk to a new misfit toy, a kite who is scared of heights and wakes him up from his hypnosis, but fails. The Toy Taker hears all the chatter, and realizing there are intruders, catches Rudolph, Clarice, Yukon, and Hermey.

They head back into the blimp, with Yukon chasing after the Toy Taker, Hermey piloting the blimp, and Rudolph and Clarice doing their best to wake up the toys from their hypnosis. Yukon finally chases the Toy Taker up to the top of the blimp. When a boomerang who doesn't come back swoops by Yukon, he loses his balance and falls. Rudolph and Clarice confront the Toy Taker, with Rudolph's nose blinding him during the confrontation.

The Toy Taker flees and parachutes his way down to Yukon's peppermint mine in hopes of escaping Rudolph and Clarice. Due to the holes in the blimp, Hermey loses control. Luckily, Bumble is there to save the blimp before any further damage can be made. The reindeer are still chasing the Toy Taker in the mine and Rudolph captures him. However, the Toy Taker tries to escape again, but Yukon manages to lasso him up with Hermey's dental floss.

Upon removing the Toy Taker's coat and hat, it is revealed he is none other than a teddy bear named Mr Cuddles. He apologizes and tells them he used to belong to a boy named Steven, who outgrew him and threw him away. After this, he became the Toy Taker to save the other toys from also being thrown away. Santa explains that while it is true that some children outgrow their toys, he knows Steven is looking for him.

Rudolph and his friends agree to bring Mr Cuddles to Queen Camilla to repair him and cheer him up. Rudolph also considers about turning his nose normal, but decides to keep it the way it is. Santa leaves to deliver the presents and Mr. Cuddles gets returned to his owner. Santa tells him that Steven didn't mean to throw him away, but was saving him as a family gift. He then places him in the bed of Steven's new daughter who awakens and cuddles him. Steven walks into the room to check on his daughter and smiles as Santa and Rudolph fly off into the night.

Cast
 Kathleen Barr – Rudolph, Mrs. Claus, Dolly, Peggy the Piggy Bank, Tooth Fairy, Rocking Horse
 Scott McNeil – Hermey, Yukon Cornelius, Boomerang Who Won't Come Back, Coach Comet, Duck
 Garry Chalk – Santa Claus, Bumble
 Richard Dreyfuss – Scoop T. Snowman
 Rick Moranis – Toy Taker/Mr. Cuddles
 Don Brown – Toy Taker's Vocal Effects
 Bruce Roberts – Toy Taker/Mr. Cuddles, Kite Who's Scared of Heights, and Scoop the Snowman's Singing Voice
 Jamie Lee Curtis – Queen Camilla
 Elizabeth Carol Savenkoff – Clarice
 Shawn Southwick – Queen Camilla and Clarice's Singing Voice
 Colin Murdock – King Moonracer, Reindeer #1
 Peter Kelamis – Foreman Elf
 Brent Miller – Hank
 Lee Tockar – Charlie in the Box, Meowing Wind-Up Mouse, Gingerbread Guard
 Terry Klassen – Telephone, Dizzy Top
 Alec Willows – Kite Who's Scared of Heights, Additional Voices

*Billed as 'Rick Moranis' in opening credits, and as 'Richard Moranis' in closing credits.

Reception

The film has received mixed to negative reviews, critics citing the poor animation and weak story, but having praise for some of the voice cast, particularly Curtis and Moranis.

See also
 Christmas film
 List of animated feature films
 List of children's films
 List of computer-animated films

References

External links
 

2001 animated films
Animated films about mammals
2001 direct-to-video films
American children's animated adventure films
American children's animated fantasy films
American direct-to-video films
American Christmas films
Canadian animated fantasy films
Canadian children's adventure films
Canadian children's animated films
Animated Christmas films
GoodTimes Entertainment
2001 computer-animated films
Direct-to-video animated films
Rudolph the Red-Nosed Reindeer
Films about sentient toys
Santa Claus in film
Films about toys
Films set on fictional islands
Films set in the Arctic
2000s children's animated films
2000s Christmas films
Canadian direct-to-video films
2001 films
2000s English-language films
2000s American films
2000s Canadian films